T120 may refer to one of the following:

Triumph Bonneville T120 motorcycle
T.120 telecommunications standard
Soviet minesweeper T-120
Mitsubishi Delica multipurpose vehicle also called T120 in some markets